SG BBM Bietigheim is a German handball club from Bietigheim-Bissingen, Baden-Württemberg. Its women's team is playing in the Handball-Bundesliga Frauen, and internationally in the EHF Champions League. The men's team plays in the 2. Handball-Bundesliga.

Women's handball team

Kits

Honours

Domestic competitions
Handball-Bundesliga Frauen:
 Champions (3): 2017, 2019, 2022
 Runners-Up (2): 2018, 2021
2. Handball-Bundesliga
 Champions: 2013
German Cup:
 Winners (2): 2021, 2022
German Supercup:
 Winners (4): 2017, 2019, 2021, 2022

European competitions
 Women's EHF European League:
 Winners: 2022
 Runners-Up: 2017

Team

Current squad
Squad for the 2022–23 season

Goalkeepers
 12  Melinda Szikora
 94  Gabriela Moreschi

Wingers
LW
 5  Antje Döll  
 9  Roos Dalemann
 67  Veronika Malá

RW
 25  Trine Østergaard
 30  Jenny Behrend 
Line players
 4  Kaba Gassama
 6  Annika Meyer
 24  Danick Snelder (c) 

Back players
LB
 14  Karolina Kudłacz-Gloc
 21  Kelly Dulfer
 22  Xenia Smits

CB
 10  Inger Smits
 11  Kerstin Kündig
 15  Kim Naidzinavicius 

RB
 27  Julia Maidhof

Transfers 
Transfers for the 2023–24 season

 Joining
  Jakob Vestergaard (Head Coach) (from  Viborg HK)
  Dorottya Faluvégi (RW) (from  Győri ETO KC)

 Leaving
  Markus Gaugisch (Head Coach)
  Trine Østergaard (RW) (to  CSM București)
  Julia Maidhof (RB) (to  SCM Râmnicu Vâlcea)
  Kim Naidzinavicius (CB) (to  HSG Bensheim/Auerbach)

Top scorers in the EHF Champions League
(All-Time) – Last updated on 21 February 2023

Notable former players

  Kim Naidzinavicius (2016–2023)
  Anna Loerper (2018–2021)
  Luisa Schulze (2016–2022)
  Dinah Eckerle (2018–2020)
  Julia Behnke (2011–2014)
  Nina Müller (2015–2018)
  Susann Müller (2015–2018)
  Julia Maidhof (2020–2023)
  Amelie Berger (2019–2021)
  Ann-Cathrin Giegerich (2011–2017)
  Jenny Karolius (2009–2011)
  Tess Wester (2015–2018)
  Maura Visser (2015–2020)
  Angela Malestein (2014–2020)
  Laura van der Heijden (2018–2020)
  Martine Smeets (2015–2018)
  Isabelle Jongenelen (2014–2015)
  Charris Rozemalen (2017–2019)
  Trine Østergaard (2020–2023)
  Fie Woller (2016–2020)
  Stine Jørgensen (2020–2022)
  Mille Hundahl (2015–2018)
  Mia Biltoft (2016–2018)
  Emily Stang Sando (2020–2021)
  Hanna Yttereng (2014–2017)
  Maren Nyland Aardahl (2019–2020)
  Anna Wysokińska (2013–2015)
  Klaudia Pielesz (2014–2015)
  Fernanda da Silva (2016–2017)
  Fabiana Diniz (2015–2016)
  Annamária Ilyés (2013–2016)
  Barbara Bagócsi (2011–2014)
  Žana Čović (2013–2015)
  Beate Scheffknecht (2009–2011)
  Paule Baudouin (2015–2016)
  Daniela Gustin (2018–2019)
  Valentyna Salamakha (2016–2021)

European record

Stadium

Name: MHPArena
City: Ludwigsburg
Capacity: 3,800
Address: Schwieberdinger Str. 30 71636
Played in the arena since: 2009-

Kit manufacturers
 Hummel

Men's handball team

Crest, colours, supporters

Kits

References

External links

Sport in Baden-Württemberg
German handball clubs
Handball clubs established in 1997
1997 establishments in Germany